Sandhill Lake is a small lake and park, west of the centre of Worksop, Nottinghamshire, England. It is passed by the Chesterfield Canal and the National Cycle Route 6. The River Ryton passes just to the southwest of the canal. The lake, formerly known as Godfrey's Pond, is popular with local anglers, and the area is also used for other leisure activities.

History
The lake is formed on the site of earlier mineral extraction activity from the Ryton floodplain.

On 3 November 2010 the park reopened after improvements under the Nottinghamshire County Council's ‘Local Improvement Scheme', funded by Groundwork Creswell, Ashfield and Mansfield and Crestra Ltd.

A £100,000 project in 2014 included installation of rwo rubber fishing platforms to encourage more recreational use of the lake, which were the subject of an arson attack on 12 October 2014.

References

Worksop
Lakes of Nottinghamshire